The Nottawasaga River Rats were a senior hockey team based out of CFB Borden.  They played in the Western Ontario Athletic Association Senior Hockey League.

Championships
Nottawasaga has won one WOAA Championship, when they were known as Georgian Bay, when they were Senior "A" champions in 2004.

2006-07 River Rats Season
This season would prove to be disastrous for the River Rats, as they finished the regular season with a 0-24-0 record, last place in the 18 team WOAA.  Georgian Bay did have a victory in mid-December, a 4-3 win over the Durham Thundercats, however they were stripped of the win due to playing with illegal players.

The River Rats struggles continued into their best of three qualifying series with the Drayton Icemen, as they were swept in two games by the Icemen, ending the River Rats season.

2007-08 River Rats Season

After dropping their first game of the season, the River Rats would earn their first victory in nearly two years when Georgian Bay would defeat the expansion team Shallow Lake Crushers 7-5, ending their long losing streak.  Wins would be few and far between for the River Rats all season long, as they finished with a 4-22-0 record, however, the Georgian Bay would finish in seventh place, and earn a spot in the "A" playoffs.

The River Rats opponent in the quarter-finals was the Milverton Four Wheel Drives, and Georgian Bay quickly found themselves down two games to none after Milverton won both the games on their home ice by scores of 13-2 and 9-3.  The series moved to Georgian Bay for the next two games, but it was Milverton continue to win by blowout scores, winning both games three and four by a 10-4 score, eliminating the River Rats from the playoffs.

In June 2008, the Georgian Bay River Rats announced that they were moving from Thornbury, Ontario to CFB Borden and were renamed the Nottawasaga River Rats.

2008-09 River Rats Season
In the River Rats first season in Nottawasaga, the club would continue to struggle, earning only one victory, defeating the Shallow Lake Crushers 6-5 in their fourteenth game of the year.  Nottawasaga finished the year with a 1-19-0 record, earning two points, and eleventh place in the WOAA North Division, failing to qualify for the post-season.  After the season, the club announced they were ceasing operations, and withdrew from the league.

Season-by-Season record
Note: GP = Games played, W = Wins, L = Losses, T= Tie, OTL = Overtime Losses, Pts = Points, GF = Goals for, GA = Goals against

More information will be added as more becomes available

Related links

CFB Borden
Western Ontario Athletic Association
WOAA Senior Hockey League

External links
WOAA Website
WOAA Senior Hockey Website
River Rats Website

Senior ice hockey teams
Ice hockey teams in Ontario